Decarcerate PA is a grassroots, all-volunteer coalition seeking to challenge mass incarceration in Pennsylvania. Decarcerate PA's platform (No New Prisons, Decarceration, Community Reinvestment) has been endorsed by almost 100 organizations. Decarcerate PA is an intentionally democratic organization that follows a committee structure, with each committee dedicated to separate tasks. Since 2011, the coalition has been challenging the construction of two new prisons outside of Philadelphia in Montgomery County, Pennsylvania, at the site of State Correctional Institution - Graterford. In 2013, Decarcerate PA organized a 113-mile march from Philadelphia to Harrisburg, Pennsylvania, the state capital, to protest Pennsylvania Governor Tom Corbett and the Pennsylvania legislature's decision to increase prison funding and decrease funding in public education and social services.

References

Prison reformers
Criminal justice
Political advocacy groups in the United States
Prison-related organizations
Prison reform